Nitellopsis obtusa is a large freshwater alga. It is also known by the common name starry stonewort. It is easily distinguished from other charophytes by star-shaped bulbils which permit vegetative reproduction.

Description
Nitellopsis obtusa has long, fairly straight branches arranged in whorls, attached at nodes to the stem at an acute angle. When in active growth, the colour is light green. At the base of the main stems, there may be creamy-white bulbils. The rhizoids are star-shaped. Plants are either male or female. The oogonia (female reproductive structures) form at the base of upper branchlets and orange to red oocytes can occur, which help distinguish this alga from the rather similar musk-grass and brittlewort.

Habitat
It tends to grow in deep, slow moving water where other plants are scarce, typically near docks and marinas.

Distribution
Nitellopsis obtusa is widely dispersed in Europe and Asia. It is known from only a few sites in the British Isles, and these include Cosmeston Lake in the Vale of Glamorgan. It has invaded the Laurentian Great Lakes in North America.

References

Charophyta